"Are You Entertained" is a song by American rapper Russ featuring English singer-songwriter Ed Sheeran. It was released as a single through Asylum Records and Diemon on July 22, 2022. The song was solely produced by Fred Again, who co-wrote the song with the artists.

Charts

References

 

 

 
2022 singles
2022 songs
Asylum Records singles
Ed Sheeran songs
Songs written by Ed Sheeran
Songs written by Fred Again